Phyllotrella is a genus of crickets in the tribe Podoscirtini.  Species have been recorded in: eastern China and Vietnam.

Species 
The Orthoptera Species File includes the following species:
 Phyllotrella fumingi Sun & Liu, 2019
 Phyllotrella hainanensis Sun & Liu, 2019
 Phyllotrella planidorsalis Gorochov, 1988 - type species
 Phyllotrella transversa Sun & Liu, 2019

References

External links
 
 Image at RareSpecies.ru

Ensifera genera
crickets
Orthoptera of Indo-China